The Roman Catholic Archdiocese of Guangzhou (Canton) is an archdiocese located in the city of Guangzhou in China.

History

 1848: Established as Apostolic Vicariate of Guangdong-Guangxi from the Diocese of Macau
 1875: Renamed as Apostolic Vicariate of Guangdong
 April 6, 1914: Renamed as Apostolic Vicariate of Guangzhou
 April 11, 1946: Promoted as Metropolitan Archdiocese of Guangzhou

The Apostolic Administrator of the Archdiocese of Guangzhou, Bishop Dominic Deng Yi-ming, S.J. was imprisoned in 1958. His release in 1981 due to a necessary cancer treatment in Hong Kong and his subsequent appointment to archbishop caused the Chinese authorities respond with the appointment of Joseph Ye Yinyun. Archbishop Ye was never recognized by the Holy See, his successor Archbishop James Lin Bingliang was recognized in 1998 only after Archbishop Deng's death in 1995. Thus the rift between the underground church and the Patriotic Church came for the Archdiocese to an end. The present archbishop Joseph Gan Junqiu won papal consent even before the consent of the Chinese authorities. His ordination was delayed, because the Chinese authorities originally wanted to have two illicit bishops preside over it.

Leadership
 Archbishops of Guangzhou (Roman rite)
 Archbishop Joseph Gan Junqiu(consecration on Dec 4, 2007, after prior papal approval)
 Archbishop James Lin Bingliang(1990-2001, papal approval in 1998). 
 Archbishop Joseph Ye Yinyun(1981-1990, without papal approval) 
 Archbishop Dominic Deng Yi-ming (Tang Yee-ming), S.J. (May 26, 1981 – June 27, 1995, after 1981 in exile)
 Bishop Dominic Deng Yi-ming (Tang Yee-ming), S.J. (later Archbishop) (Apostolic Administrator October 1, 1950 – May 26, 1981)
 Archbishop Antoine-Pierre-Jean Fourquet, M.E.P. (April 11, 1946 – December 11, 1947)
 Vicars Apostolic of Guangzhou 廣州 (Roman Rite) 
 Bishop Antoine-Pierre-Jean Fourquet, M.E.P. (later Archbishop) (February 20, 1923 – April 11, 1946)
 Bishop Jean-Baptiste-Marie Budes de Guébriant, M.E.P. (later Archbishop) (April 28, 1916 – March 21, 1921)
 Bishop Adolphe Rayssac, M.E.P. (Apostolic Administrator 1915 – 1916)
 Bishop Jean-Marie Mérel, M.E.P. (April 6, 1914 – August 6, 1914)
Vicars Apostolic of Guangdong 廣東 (Roman Rite) 
 Bishop Jean-Marie Mérel, M.E.P. (April 20, 1901 – April 6, 1914)
 Bishop Augustin Chausse, M.E.P. (April 5, 1886 – October 12, 1900)
 Bishop Philippe François Zéphirin Guillemin, M.E.P. (November 16, 1853 – April 5, 1886)

Suffragan dioceses
 Beihai 北海
 Jiangmen 江門
 Jiaying 嘉應
 Shantou 汕頭
 Shaozhou 韶州

Catholic churches 

There are several catholic churches in Guangzhou city. Few of them are offering masses in foreign languages regularly.

Guangzhou City

 Sacred Heart Cathedral of Guangzhou
 Address: No. 56, Yide Road, Guangzhou (in Chinese: 一德路56号). 
 English mass: every Sunday 03:30 pm.
 Shamian Church of Our Lady of Lourdes 
 Address: No. 14, Shamian Avenue, Shamian, Guangzhou.
 English mass: every Sunday at 11:00 am.
 St. Francis of Assisi Chapel
 Address: No. 26, Shanhehou Street, Yuexiu District, Guangzhou (in Chinese: 广州市越秀区山河后街26号) 
 English mass: every Sunday at 10:00 am.

See also
Sacred Heart Cathedral of Guangzhou
Christianity & Catholicism in China
Vatican City & the Chinese Patriotic Catholic Association
List of Roman Catholic dioceses in China & the Episcopal Conference of China

References

External links
 GCatholic.org
 Catholic Hierarchy
 UCAN Diocese Profile

Guangzhou
Religious organizations established in 1848
Religion in Guangzhou
Guangzhou
1848 establishments in China
Christianity in Guangdong